Raveniopsis is a genus of flowering plants belonging to the family Rutaceae.

It is native to northern Brazil, Guyana and Venezuela.

The genus name of Raveniopsis is in honour of Jean François Ravin (18th century), a French doctor, professor of botany and medicine at the University of Coimbra in Portugal. It was first described and published in Brittonia Vol.3 on page 166 in 1939.

Known species
According to Kew:

Raveniopsis abyssicola 
Raveniopsis aracaensis 
Raveniopsis breweri 
Raveniopsis campinicola 
Raveniopsis capitata 
Raveniopsis cowaniana 
Raveniopsis fraterna 
Raveniopsis jauaensis 
Raveniopsis linearis 
Raveniopsis microphyllus 
Raveniopsis necopinata 
Raveniopsis nubicola 
Raveniopsis paruana 
Raveniopsis peduncularis 
Raveniopsis ruellioides 
Raveniopsis sericea 
Raveniopsis stelligera 
Raveniopsis steyermarkii 
Raveniopsis tomentosa 
Raveniopsis trifoliolata

References

Zanthoxyloideae
Zanthoxyloideae genera
Plants described in 1939
Flora of Guyana
Flora of North Brazil
Flora of Venezuela